HGC can stand for:

Human Genetics Commission
Hercules Graphics Card
H.O.C. Gazellen-Combinatie, a Dutch field hockey club
HGC Global Communications, an internet service provider in Hong Kong
 HGC (field hockey), a Dutch field hockey club located in Wassenaar, South Holland on the border of The Hague